The 1961–62 National Hurling League was the 31st season of the National Hurling League.

Division 1

The league saw a major restructuring for the 1961–62 season. Division 1 was split into Group 1A and Group 1B consisting of five teams each and Group 1C consisting of four teams. The top team in each group qualified for the knock-out stage.

Tipperary came into the season as defending champions of the 1960-61 season. Offaly and Westmeath entered Division 1 as part of the restructuring.

On 6 May 1962, Kilkenny won the title after a 1–16 to 1–8 win over Cork in the final. It was their first league title since 1932-33 and their second league title overall.

Division 1A table

Group stage

Division 1B table

Group stage

Division 1C table

Group stage

Play-off

Knock-out stage

Semi-final

Final

Top scorer

Top scorers overall

Top scorers in a single game

Division 2

The league saw a major restructuring for the 1961–62 season. Division 2 was split into Group 2A and Group 2B consisting of three teams each. The top team in each group qualified for the knock-out stage.

On 20 May 1962, Kerry won the title after a 3–8 to 1–2 win over Meath.

Division 2A table

Division 2B table

Play-off

Knock-out stage

Final

References

National Hurling League seasons
Lea
Lea